Toxicoscordion is a genus of flowering plants in the family Melanthiaceae, tribe Melanthieae, first described as a genus in 1903. The genus is mainly distributed in the midwestern United States and western North America, with some species in western Canada and northern Mexico.

Molecular phylogenetic studies in the 21st century have resulted in number of changes to placements within this tribe. Toxicoscordion was long submerged into the genus Zigadenus, but its separate position in the phylogeny of the Melanthieae has been confirmed. Members of Toxicoscordion may also be distinguished from other similar members of the deathcamas tribe by the presence of narrow, clawed tepals with a single, conspicuous, rounded gland.

 Species
 Toxicoscordion brevibracteatum (syn. Zigadenus brevibracteatus) - desert deathcamas - Baja California, Sonora, California
 Toxicoscordion exaltatum (syn. Zigadenus exaltatus) - giant deathcamas - California, Nevada
 Toxicoscordion fontanum (syn. Zigadenus fontanus) - smallflower deathcamas - California
 Toxicoscordion fremontii (syn. Zigadenus fremontii) - Frèmont's deathcamas, star zigadene (several varieties) - Baja California, Oregon, California
 Toxicoscordion micranthum (syn. Zigadenus micranthus) - smallflower deathcamas - Oregon, California
 Toxicoscordion nuttallii (syn. Zigadenus nuttallii) - Nuttall's deathcamas - SC United States
 Toxicoscordion paniculatum (syn. Zigadenus paniculatus) - foothill deathcamas, sand-corn - W United States
 Toxicoscordion venenosum (syn. Zigadenus venenosus) - death camas, meadow deathcamas - W Canada, W USA, Baja California

References

 
Melanthiaceae genera
Flora of North America